The Platters are an American vocal group formed in 1952. They are one of the most successful vocal groups of the early rock and roll era. Their distinctive sound bridges the pre-rock Tin Pan Alley tradition and the new burgeoning genre. The act has gone through multiple line-ups over the years, earning it the branding tag "Many Voices One Name", with the most successful incarnation comprising lead tenor Tony Williams, David Lynch, Paul Robi, founder and naming member Herb Reed, and Zola Taylor. The group had 40 charting singles on the  Billboard Hot 100 between 1955 and 1967, including four number-one hits.  In 1990, the Platters were inducted into the Rock and Roll Hall of Fame. The Platters continue to perform around the world with Herb Reed Enterprises (an LLC set up by Reed in response to numerous fake Platters groups) owning the rights and trademark to the name.

Band formation and early years
The Platters formed in Los Angeles in 1952 and were initially managed by Federal Records A&R man Ralph Bass. The original group consisted of Herb Reed, Alex Hodge, Cornell Gunter and Joe Jefferson. Reed named the group while sitting around a kitchen table with Hodge and others. He was inspired by the "turntable" of an old phonograph machine and the "platter" that spun the vinyl records.

In June 1953, Gunter left to join The Flairs and was replaced by lead vocalist Tony Williams. The band then released two singles with Federal Records, under the management of Bass, but found little success. Bass then asked his friend, music entrepreneur, and songwriter Buck Ram, to coach the group in the hope of getting a hit record. Ram made some changes to the lineup, most notably the addition of female vocalist Zola Taylor and, in autumn 1954, the replacement of Alex Hodge by Paul Robi.

Under Ram's guidance, The Platters recorded eight songs for Federal in the R&B/gospel style, scoring a few minor regional hits on the West Coast, and backed Williams' sister, Linda Hayes. One song recorded during their Federal tenure, "Only You (And You Alone)", originally written by Ram for the Ink Spots, was deemed unreleasable by the label, though copies of this early version do exist.

Despite their lack of chart success, The Platters were a profitable touring group, successful enough that the Penguins, coming off their #8 single "Earth Angel", asked Ram to manage them as well. With the Penguins in hand, Ram was able to parlay Mercury Records' interest into a 2-for-1 deal. To sign the Penguins, Ram insisted, Mercury also had to take The Platters. The Penguins would never have a hit for the label.

Charting hits
Convinced by Jean Bennett and Tony Williams that "Only You" had potential, Ram had The Platters re-record the song during their first session for Mercury. Released in the summer of 1955, it became the group's first Top Ten hit on the pop charts and topped the R&B charts for seven weeks. The follow-up, "The Great Pretender", with lyrics written in the washroom of the Flamingo Hotel in Las Vegas by Buck Ram, exceeded the success of their debut and became The Platters' first national #1 hit. "The Great Pretender" was also the act's biggest R&B hit, with an 11-week run atop that chart. In 1956, The Platters appeared in the first major motion picture based around rock and roll, Rock Around the Clock, and performed both "Only You" and "The Great Pretender".

The Platters' unique vocal style had touched a chord in the music-buying public. A string of hit singles followed, including three more national #1 hits and more modest chart successes such as "I'm Sorry" (#11) and "He's Mine" (#23) in 1957, "Enchanted" (#12) in 1959, and "(You've Got) The Magic Touch" (#4) in 1956. The Platters soon hit upon the successful formula of updating older standards, such as "My Prayer", "Twilight Time", "Harbor Lights", "To Each His Own", "If I Didn't Care", and Jerome Kern's "Smoke Gets in Your Eyes". This latter release caused a small controversy after Kern's widow expressed concern that her late husband's composition would be turned into a "rock and roll" record. It topped both the American and British charts in The Platters-style arrangement.

The Platters differed from most other groups of the era because Ram had the group incorporated in 1956 as Five Platters, Inc (FPI). Each member of the group received a 20% share in the stock, full royalties, and their Social Security was paid. As group members left one by one, Ram and his business partner, Jean Bennett, bought their stock, which they claimed gave them ownership of the "Platters" name. A court later ruled, however, that "FPI was a sham used by Mr. Ram to obtain ownership in the name the 'Platters', and FPI's issuance of stock to the group members was 'illegal and void because it violated California corporate securities law."

The group was inducted into the Rock and Roll Hall of Fame in 1990 and into the Vocal Group Hall of Fame in its inaugural year of 1998. The Platters were the first rock and roll era group to have a Top Ten album in the United States. They were also the only act to have three songs included on the American Graffiti soundtrack that fueled an oldies revival already underway in the early to mid-1970s: "Smoke Gets in Your Eyes", "The Great Pretender", and "Only You (and You Alone)". The group had four top 100 compilation albums in the Australian top 100 between 1975 and 1986.

Changing line-up
The line-up in 1952 included lead vocalist Cornell Gunter, Herb Reed, Alex Hodge, Joe Jefferson, and David Lynch. Soon, Gunter was replaced by tenor Tony Williams.

The band's second manager Ram decided to build the group around Williams's distinctive and versatile voice and his ability to bring life to Ram's songs. Within a year, Alex Hodge and Jefferson were also out and replaced by Paul Robi and a woman, Zola Taylor. The details of baritone Hodge's departure are muddy; author Peter A. Grendysa, says Ram fired Alex Hodge in October 1954 after having been accused of possession of marijuana. Bookers and the record company were told that Hodge was let go for bouncing a 15-dollar check. The resulting line-up, the one remembered for some of the group's timeless hits, lasted until 1960.

As a group, The Platters began to have difficulties with the public after 1959, when the four male members were arrested in Cincinnati on drug and prostitution charges. Although no one was convicted, their professional reputation was seriously damaged and US radio stations started removing their records from playlists, forcing the group to rely more heavily on European bookings.

In 1960, lead vocalist Williams left to pursue a solo career and was replaced by tenor Sonny Turner. Mercury refused to issue further Platters releases without Williams on lead vocals, provoking a lawsuit between the label and manager Ram. As a result, the label spent two years releasing old Williams-era material until the group's contract lapsed.

The group's line-up splintered further: in 1964 Taylor left and was consecutively replaced by Beverly Hansen Harris, Barbara Randolph and, in 1965, by Sandra Dawn. 1965 also saw the departure of Robi, who was replaced by Nate Nelson, former lead voice of the Flamingos.

This splintering of the group's line-up led to wrangling over The Platters' name, with injunctions, non-compete clauses, and multiple versions of the act touring at the same time. Williams, Robi, and Taylor led their own Platters' groups and for a short while, Taylor, Robi, and Lynch joined forces as "The Original Platters" with Williams-clone Johnny Barnes as their lead singer.

To distinguish his group from the offshoots started by former members, Ram added his name to that of the group. The "Buck Ram Platters", built to showcase his songs, were signed to Musicor Records and enjoyed a short chart renaissance in 1966–67, with the comeback singles "I Love You 1000 Times", "With This Ring", and the Motown-influenced "Washed Ashore". Sonny Turner sang the lead on these three records, with Reed, Lynch, Nelson, and Dawn completing the group. Nelson left the group in 1967. Dawn, who left in 1969, was replaced by Regina Koco, who stayed with the group until 1983.

Also, in 1969, Reed, the final member of the original Platters, resigned from the group. For a period of time, Reed performed under the name Herb Reed and The Platters. Nelson also worked with this group until suffering a fatal heart attack in 1984.

After Reed's departure, Ram illegally continued to promote his own Platters group. Turner left in 1970 and was replaced by Monroe Powell, who remained a constant member from 1970 to 1995, amid many other line-up changes. Tony Williams formed his version of The Platters in 1971 and announced a worldwide tour. In 1995, a dispute between Powell and manager Jean Bennett (who had purchased Personality Productions, the booking/management arm of the Platters' business, from Ram in 1966) led to the two parting ways. At the time, the group's line-up was in limbo, leaving one person, Kenn Johnson, as the only other group member. Powell and Johnson continued touring as "The Platters", with Bennett hiring five new singers to be the "Buck Ram Platters".

Despite Ram and Bennett's assertions, it was later determined that Five Platters Inc., and Jean Bennett never had legitimate rights to The Platters name.

Legal battles
A profusion of legal challenges ensued among the many groups of Platters. Those looking to hear the classic lineup of songs had their pick of approved, disputed, and substituted Platters, including Sonny Turner's, Zola Taylor's, Ritchie Jones' (member 1984–85), Milton Bullock's (member 1967–70), Paul Robi's (managed by his widow), Jean Bennett's "Buck Ram Platters", Monroe Powell's, Herb Reed's, and several other groups with no current ties to the original group. Many had once contained former members who were now retired or deceased.

Powell, who had been touring under the Platters' name, was sued by Bennett for breach of contract. Bennett and Powell later reached an agreement that Powell would be able to tour, but only as "The Platters featuring Monroe Powell". In 1994, Jean Bennett fraudulently licensed the name for a show at the Sahara Casino in Las Vegas; that show ran for 15 years.

Shortly before Robi succumbed to pancreatic cancer on February 1, 1989, he won a long court battle against Ram's estate and was awarded compensation and the right to use the Platters' name. Those rights were stripped from Robi's widow in 1997, and the exclusive right to tour as "The Platters" was awarded to Reed. A series of rulings in 1999, 2002, and 2004 gave Bennett the common law right to the name. The 2002 case legally rescinded Reed's exclusive trademark rights, and the trademark was returned to the Five Platters, Inc. and Bennett.

In January 2006, Las Vegas based G.E.M. Group, Inc. presented Bennett with a contract to buy the assets of "the singing group The Platters."  G.E.M. then took Personality Productions, Inc. (Bennett's separate management company) corporate records and files and attempted to take the company's phone numbers.  There was an immediate disagreement between Bennett and G.E.M., which filed a lawsuit to attain certain corporate assets, Bennett's personal property and the assets of the 1950s Platters.  The case was dismissed for lack of action on G.E.M.s part.  In June 2006, G.E.M. entered into an agreement with Sonny Turner, who'd been the lead singer of the Platters from 1960 to 1970. Turner had not been able to bill himself as "The Platters" since 1972 due  to a legal injunction. However, Turner later sued G.E.M.

In 2007, Reed discussed the abundance of touring Platters groups: "I have to laugh because when you ask me how I feel about it, I'm irate, I'm infuriated. ... I've lost 25 weeks of work a year."

Herb Reed died in June 2012 at 83. Reed was the only group member to appear on every original Platters recording. Sonny Turner, who replaced Tony Williams in late 1959, performed as Sonny Turner, former lead singer of The Platters. Sonny brought The Platters back to the charts in 1966 with the hits, "I Love You 1000 Times", "With This Ring", and "Washed Ashore".. He died on January 13, 2022.

In 2011, Herb Reed and his companies obtained judgments declaring that his rights to the name were superior to all others, including Five Platters Inc. and Jean Bennett. In March 2014, Herb Reed's companies were granted a judgment finding they had superior rights to the name "The Platters" over Larry Marshak and his companies, who claimed to have received rights through FPI and/or Tony Williams In April 2014, Reed's company obtained a judgment against the World Famous Platters requiring them to identify themselves as a "Tribute to the Platters" or a "Salute to the Platters".

In June 2014, Herb Reed's companies obtained a judgment against former singer Monroe Powell for trademark infringement. The Nevada district court granted Reed summary judgment, awarding him over $59,000 in damages (from US and international tour performances) and permanent injunctive relief, preventing Powell from using the "Platters" name without using the words "tribute" or "salute".

In 2016, Herb Reed Enterprises LLC was awarded a trademark from the United States Patent and Trademark Office for the exclusive use of the Platters name. Reed's legacy is maintained by Frederick Balboni, Reed's manager, veteran broadcast journalist and music promoter, and the owner of Massachusetts-based Balboni Communications Group.

Personnel

Original lineup (1952)
Cornell Gunter
Alex Hodge
Curtis Williams
Joe Jefferson

Federal lineup (1953–1954)
Tony Williams Lead singer
Alex Hodge
Herb Reed
David Lynch
Zola Taylor

Mercury Classic lineup (1955–1959)
 Tony Williams Lead singer
 Herb Reed
 David Lynch
 Paul Robi
Zola Taylor

Mercury and Musicor lineup (1959–1970)
 Sonny Turner Lead singer
 Herb Reed
 Paul Robi
 Zola Taylor
 David Lynch
 Nate Nelson
 Barbara Randolph
 Sandra Dawn
 Duke Daniels
 James Austin, Jr.
 Milton Bullock

Official lineup 
:
 Lance Bernard Bryant
 Jovian Ford
 Brittany Wallace
 Omar Ross

Other line-ups

Various line-ups using The Platters' name have toured concurrently since the 1970s. The following are some of the groups that at one time or another illegally called themselves The Platters:

Paul Robi's Platters
 Paul Robi
 Beverly Harris
 Gerry Garrett
 Virgil Gibson
 Elmer Hopper

 Replacements
 Tyrone Sweet
 Herb Rawlings
 Tommy Smiley

 Sonny Turner's Platters (1970–)
 Sonny Turner
 Daemine Lowe
 Michelle Johnson
 Keith Blake

 The Platters featuring Monroe Powell
 Monroe Powell
 Wilson Williams
 Kenn Johnson

 The World Famous Platters
 Eddie Stovall
 Lawrence Lockard
 JT Marshall
 Andre Sheppard
 The Platters featuring Tony Williams
 Tony Williams
 Helen Williams
 Ronnie McCain aka Ronnie Forte
 Ernie Wright

Other former members
 Kathleen Lewis
 Kristy Brook
 Willie McCall
Gene Williams
 Herb McQuay
 Paris Red
Wille Nash
Damon Freeman
Sandra Dawn
Wayne Miller
Kenny Williams
Eddie Lee Williams "Eddie Kool"

Singles discography

References

External links

 The Platters US Singles Discography
 The Platters US Albums Discography
 The Platters Information Site
 Herb Reed and The Platters web site
 Sonny Turner, Legendary Former Lead Singer of the Platters
 List of hundreds of singers who have appeared with the various Platters groups
 "The Platters" Vocal Group Hall of Fame Page
 The Platters - by Dr. Frank Hoffmann
 The Platters - Biography
 History of Rock - The Platters
 
 
 

 
1952 establishments in California
African-American musical groups
American rhythm and blues musical groups
American vocal groups
Doo-wop groups
Federal Records artists
Mercury Records artists
Musical groups established in 1952
Vertigo Records artists